Celebrando may refer to:

Celebrando, album by Milly Quezada, Milly, Jocelyn y los Vecinos
Celebrando (Juan Gabriel album)
"Celebrando", by the Costa Rican band Marfil

See also
Celebrando Al Príncipe compilation album by Mexican pop singer Cristian Castro